Let 'Em Bleed: The Mixxtape, Vol. 2 is a mixtape by DJ Clay. Released in 2008, it is the second installment of a four-part series of mixtapes which contain brand new and remixed songs from artists from the Psychopathic Records and Hatchet House roster. This volume also features a solo song by Bizarre of D12, an artist not signed to Psychopathic Records or Hatchet House. A third volume was  November 11, 2008 released.

Track listing

Chart positions

References

2008 mixtape albums
Hatchet House compilation albums
Sequel albums